Let Me Love You may refer to:

Albums
 Let Me Love You, a 1976 album by Mark Holden

Songs
 "Let Me Love You" (Ariana Grande song), 2016 song featuring Lil Wayne
 "Let Me Love You" (DJ Rebel and Mohombi song), 2016 song featuring Shaggy
 "Let Me Love You" (DJ Snake song), 2016 song featuring Justin Bieber
 "Let Me Love You" (Junggigo and Chanyeol song), 2017 song by Junggigo and Chanyeol
 "Let Me Love You" (Mario song), 2004
 "Let Me Love You" (Tamara Todevska, Vrčak and Adrijan Gaxha song), Macedonian entry for the Eurovision Song Contest 2008
 "Let Me Love You (Until You Learn to Love Yourself)", 2012 song by Ne-Yo
 "Let Me Love You", song by Da Buzz from their 2000 album Da Sound 
 "Let Me Love You", song by II D Extreme from their 2003 album II
 "Let Me Love You", 1964 song by B.B. King
 "Let Me Love You", 1983 song by Beres Hammond
 "Let Me Love You", 1964 song by Bobby Rush
 "Let Me Love You", 1956 song by Boyd Bennett and His Rockets
 "Let Me Love You", 1981 song by Bunny Mack
 "Let Me Love You", 2000 song by Da Buzz
 "Let Me Love You", 1980 song by Dennis Brown
 "Let Me Love You", 1975 song by Ernie K-Doe
 "Let Me Love You", 1980 song by Fred Knoblock
 "Let Me Love You", 1997 song by George Nooks
 "Let Me Love You", 1999 song by Geri Halliwell
 "Let Me Love You", 1968 song by Jackie Edwards and Soulmaker's
 "Let Me Love You", 1987 song by James D-Train Williams
 "Let Me Love You", 1972 song by Jesse James and the James Boys
 "Let Me Love You", 1965 song by Jimmy Young
 "Let Me Love You", 1952 song by Bart Howard
 "Let Me Love You", 1990 song by King Size Taylor
 "Let Me Love You", 2018 song by Kobra and the Lotus
 "Let Me Love You", 1994 song by Lalah Hathaway
 "Let Me Love You", 1952 song by Lee Bell
 "Let Me Love You", 1983 song by Leroy Smart
 "Let Me Love You", 1960 song by Marv Johnson
 "Let Me Love You", 1978 song by Michael Henderson
 "Let Me Love You", 1986 song by The Milkshakes
 "Let Me Love You", 1970 song by Mornin'
 "Let Me Love You", 1966 song by New Colony Six
 "Let Me Love You", 1966 song by Oliver Bond
 "Let Me Love You", 1974 song by Ralph Graham
 "Let Me Love You", 1969 song by Ray Charles
 "Let Me Love You", 1973 song by Slim Smith
 "Let Me Love You", 1954 song by Tommy Collins
 "Let Me Love You", 1968 song by Troy Shondell
 "Let Me Love You", 1981 song by the Zorros

See also
 "Let You Love Me", a 2018 song by Rita Ora